The Morals of Marcus (1915) is a lost American silent comedy-drama film produced by the Famous Players Film Company and distributed by Paramount Pictures. It is based on a 1905 novel by William John Locke, The Morals of Marcus Ordeyne, which was later produced on Broadway in 1907. The star of the play was Marie Doro who makes her motion picture debut in this film version. Both Edwin S. Porter and Hugh Ford take part in the direction of the film. The story was remade in 1921 as Morals with May McAvoy and in 1935 as The Morals of Marcus with Lupe Vélez.

Cast
Marie Doro – Carlotta
Eugene Ormonde – Marcus Ordeyne
Ida Darling – Mrs. Ordeyne
Julian L'Estrange – Pasquale
Russell Bassett – Hamdi
Frank Andrews – Mustapha
Wellington Playter – English Vice-Consul
Phyllis Carrington – Vice-Consul's Wife
Helen Freeman – Dora
J. W. Austin – Harry Pelligrew

References

External links
 
 
 
preserved program brochure(archived at worthpoint)
large herald 

1915 films
American silent feature films
Lost American films
Films based on British novels
American films based on plays
Films directed by Hugh Ford
Films based on adaptations
1915 comedy-drama films
1910s English-language films
American black-and-white films
Lost comedy-drama films
1915 lost films
1910s American films
Silent American comedy-drama films